Oliviero Toscani (born 28 February 1942) is an Italian photographer, best-known worldwide for designing controversial advertising campaigns for Italian brand Benetton, from 1982 to 2000. 
Toscani was born in Milan, and took up photography following in the footsteps of his father, Fedele Toscani, a photoreporter for the newspaper Corriere della Sera. After obtaining his diploma at the Kunstgewerbeschule Zürich, he started working with different magazines, including Elle, Vogue, L'Uomo Vogue and Harper's Bazaar.

In 1982 he started working as Art Director for the Benetton Group. One of his most famous campaigns included a photo (by Therese Frare) of David Kirby dying of AIDS, lying in a Columbus, Ohio, hospital bed, surrounded by his grieving relatives. The picture was controversial due to its similarity to a pietà painting and because critics of the ad thought the use of this image to sell clothing was exploiting the victim, though the Kirby family stated that they authorized the use and that it helped increase AIDS awareness. Other advertisements included references to racism (notably one with three almost identical human hearts, which were actually pig hearts, with the words 'white', 'black', and 'yellow' as captions), war, religion and even capital punishment.

In the early 1990s, Toscani co-founded the magazine Colors (also owned by Benetton) with American graphic designer Tibor Kalman. With the tagline "a magazine about the rest of the world", Colors built on the multiculturalism prevalent at that time and in Benetton's ad campaigns, while remaining editorially independent from group. Toscani left Benetton in 2000.
 
A long-term Tuscany resident, in 2003 he created in collaboration with Regione Toscana a new research facility for modern communication called 'La Sterpaia'.

In 2005, Toscani sparked controversy again with his photographs for an advertising campaign for the men's clothing brand 'Ra-Re'. Their portrayals of men participating in homosexual behaviour angered groups such as the Catholic parents' association Movimento Italiano Genitori, who called the pictures 'vulgar'. The campaign came amidst ongoing debate in Italy about gay rights.

Toscani unsuccessfully stood as a candidate for parliament for the new Rose in the Fist party in the Italian general election held on 9 and 10 April 2006.

In September 2007, a new campaign against anorexia was again controversial due to his shocking photography of an emaciated woman (Isabelle Caro).

When Luciano Benetton returned as executive director of the Benetton Group in January 2018, he brought along Oliviero Toscani.

In 2018, Toscani became a member of the Italian Democratic Party (PD).

References

External links
  
 OT Horses: American Quarter Horses  Oliviero Toscani
 Interview with Oliviero Toscani
 The True Colors of Oliviero Toscani from AdAge International
 Oliviero Toscani from made-in-Italy.com (in Italian)
 Oliviero Toscani at Salon
 colorsmagazine.com
 ANOREXIA. Storia di un'immagine IMDB
 ANOREXIA. STORIA DI UN'IMMAGINE official info
 The Photo That Brought AIDS Home – slideshow by Life magazine

Photographers from Milan
1942 births
Living people
Italian magazine founders
Italian magazine editors
Italian atheists
Benetton people
Zurich University of the Arts alumni
Italian photographers